Stefan Robert Welch (born 12 August 1988 in Adelaide, Australia) is an Australian professional baseball first baseman for the Adelaide Bite of the Australian Baseball League. He Had played for the New York Mets, Pittsburgh Pirates and Boston Red Sox organisations.

Professional career

New York Mets
He was scouted by Australian national coach Tony Harris in 2005 and eventually signed with the New York Mets in 2005 at the age of 16. In 2006, Welch made his Claxton Shield debut for the South Australia Bite where he went 0 for 1 with 3 walks. He made his pro debut in 2007 for the GCL Mets where he batted .288 in his first season. In 2009, he was twice selected for the Australia national baseball team; in March for the 2009 World Baseball Classic, and again in September for the 2009 Baseball World Cup. Welch spent the 2010 and 2011 seasons with the Class A-Advanced St. Lucie Mets.

Pittsburgh Pirates
The Pittsburgh Pirates signed Welch in November 2011. He began the season with the Bradenton Marauders. In his first game with the Marauders, which was against St. Lucie, Welch was hit by a Ryan Fraser pitch with the bases loaded in the bottom of the 11th inning, to score Gift Ngoepe and give the Marauders a walk-off win. Welch's first promotion to Double-A came in June 2012, when he was promoted to the Double-A Altoona Curve. In November 2012, Welch re-signed with the Pirates.

Boston Red Sox
Welch was traded to the Boston Red Sox in early June 2013, starting with the High A Salem Red Sox. He then got promoted to AA in March 2014 and played the season in Portland, Maine.

Adelaide Bite
Welch played for the Adelaide Bite of the Australian Baseball League (ABL) from 2010 to 2017. After missing the 2017-18 season, Welch returned to the Bite for the 2018-19 season. After the conclusion of the season, Welch announced his retirement, leading the club in all time in games (284), hits (258), runs (160), home runs (35) and RBI (169)

Personal
Stefan attended Norwood Morialta High School and graduated in 2006 He also played cricket, football, and basketball for local Adelaide clubs and school teams. He still currently plays Division 1 Baseball for the Goodwood Indians He and his wife, Shannon along with their two children, Ledger and River live happily in Australia since 2015.

References

External links

Stefan Welch – Baseball America
Minor League Baseball

1988 births
Living people
Adelaide Bite players
Altoona Curve players
Australian expatriate baseball players in the United States
Baseball first basemen
Baseball third basemen
Bradenton Marauders players
Gulf Coast Mets players
Kingsport Mets players
People from Alice Springs
Portland Sea Dogs players
Salem Red Sox players
Savannah Sand Gnats players
Sportspeople from Adelaide
St. Lucie Mets players
2009 World Baseball Classic players
2013 World Baseball Classic players
2017 World Baseball Classic players